NLR family pyrin domain containing 3 (NLRP3) (previously known as NACHT, LRR and PYD domains-containing protein 3 [NALP3] and cryopyrin), is a protein that in humans is encoded by the NLRP3 gene located on the long arm of chromosome 1.

NLRP3 is expressed predominantly in macrophages and as a component of the inflammasome,  detects products of damaged cells such as extracellular ATP and crystalline uric acid. Activated NLRP3 in turn triggers an immune response.  Mutations in the NLRP3 gene are associated with a number of organ specific autoimmune diseases.

Nomenclature 
NACHT, LRR, and PYD are respectively acronyms for:
 NACHT – NAIP (neuronal apoptosis inhibitor protein), C2TA [class 2 transcription activator, of the MHC, HET-E (heterokaryon incompatibility) and TP1 (telomerase-associated protein 1)
 PYD – "PYRIN domain," after the pyrin proteins The NLRP3 gene name abbreviates "NLR family, pyrin domain containing 3," where NLR refers to "nucleotide-binding domain, leucine-rich repeat."

The NACHT, LRR and PYD domains-containing protein 3 is also called:
 cold induced autoinflammatory syndrome 1 (CIAS1),
 caterpiller-like receptor 1.1 (CLR1.1), and 
 PYRIN-containing APAF1-like protein 1 (PYPAF1).

Structure
This gene encodes a pyrin-like protein which contains a pyrin domain, a nucleotide-binding site (NBS) domain, and a leucine-rich repeat (LRR) motif. This protein interacts with pyrin domain (PYD) of apoptosis-associated speck-like protein containing a CARD (ASC). Proteins which contain the caspase recruitment domain, CARD, have been shown to be involved in inflammation and immune response.

Function 
NLRP3 is a component of the innate immune system that functions as a pattern recognition receptor (PRR) that recognizes pathogen-associated molecular patterns (PAMPs).  NLRP3 belongs to the NOD-like receptor (NLR) subfamily of PRRs and NLRP3 together with the adaptor ASC protein PYCARD forms a caspase-1 activating complex known as the NLRP3 inflammasome.  NLRP3 in the absence of activating signal is kept in an inactive state complexed with HSP90 and SGT1 in the cytoplasm. NLRP3 inflammasome detects danger signals such as crystalline uric acid and extracellular ATP released by damaged cells. These signals release HSP90 and SGT1 from and recruit ASC protein and caspase-1 to the inflammasome complex.  Caspase-1 within the activated NLRP3 inflammasome complex in turn activates the inflammatory cytokine, IL-1β.

The NLRP3 inflammasome appears to be activated by changes in intracellular potassium caused by potassium efflux from mechanosensitive ion channels located in the cell membrane. It appears that NLRP3 is also regulated by reactive oxygen species (ROS), though the precise mechanisms of such regulation has not been determined.

It is suggested that NLRP3 provides protection against Streptococcus pneumoniae infections by activating STAT6 and SPDEF.

Pathology 
Mutations in the NLRP3 gene have been associated with a spectrum of dominantly inherited autoinflammatory diseases called cryopyrin-associated periodic syndrome (CAPS). This includes familial cold autoinflammatory syndrome (FCAS), Muckle–Wells syndrome (MWS), chronic infantile neurological cutaneous and articular (CINCA) syndrome, neonatal onset multisystem inflammatory disease (NOMID), and keratoendotheliitis fugax hereditaria.

Defects in this gene have also been linked to  familial Mediterranean fever. In addition, the NLRP3 inflammasome has a role in the  pathogenesis of gout, hemorrhagic stroke and neuroinflammation occurring in protein-misfolding diseases, such as Alzheimer's,  Parkinson's, and prion diseases. Amelioration of mouse models of many diseases has been shown to occur by deletion of the NLRP3 inflammasome, including gout, type 2 diabetes, multiple sclerosis, Alzheimer's disease, and atherosclerosis. The compound β-Hydroxybutyrate has been shown to block NLRP3 activation, and thus may be of benefit for many of these diseases.

Deregulation of NLRP3 has been connected with carcinogenesis. For example, all the components of the NLRP3 inflammasome are downregulated or completely lost in human hepatocellular carcinoma.

Inhibition 
The NLRP3 inflammasome has garnered attention as a potential drug target for a variety of diseases underpinned by inflammation. The diarylsulfonylurea MCC-950 has been identified as a potent and selective NLRP3 inhibitor. Nodthera and Inflazome, have entered phase I clinical trials with NLRP3 inhibitors. Another NLRP3 antagonist is Dapansutrile (OLT1177). This β-sulfonyl nitrile molecule compound was developed by Olactec Therapeutics, and is a selective NLRP3 inhibitor. Dapansutrile, been used in clinical trials as a remedy for heart failure, osteoarthritis and gouty arthritis.

References and notes

External links 
 

LRR proteins
Human proteins
NOD-like receptors